The 2018–19 Mercer Bears men's basketball team represented Mercer University during the 2018–19 NCAA Division I men's basketball season. The Bears, led by 11th-year head coach Bob Hoffman, played their home games at Hawkins Arena on the university's Macon, Georgia campus as fifth-year members of the Southern Conference.

Previous season
The Bears finished the 2017–18 season 19–15, 11–7 in SoCon play to finish in a tie for fourth place. They lost in the quarterfinals of the SoCon tournament to Wofford. They were invited to the College Basketball Invitational where they defeated Grand Canyon in the first round before losing in the quarterfinals to North Texas.

Roster

Schedule and results

|-
! colspan="9" style=| Regular season

|-
! colspan="9" style=| SoCon tournament

Source

References

Mercer Bears men's basketball seasons
Mercer
Mercer Bears
Mercer Bears